Meenda Sorgam is a 1960 Indian Tamil-language romantic musical film, written and directed by Sridhar. The film stars Gemini Ganesan and Padmini, with K. A. Thangavelu, T. R. Ramachandran, N. Lalitha and Manorama in supporting roles. It was released on 29 July 1960, and failed commercially.

Plot 

Nirmala is a poor but talented dancer who falls in love with Sekar, a rich man's son. But Sekar is forced into a marriage with Prathiba, a rich man's spoilt daughter. Inconsolable, Nirmala promises her lover that she will never give public performances. Due to various circumstances, Sekar's finances suffer losses and his house is put up for auction. To rescue him from a dire future, Nirmala breaks her promise and gives a dance performance. With the money thus earned, she saves his house. But Sekar is unaware of this. When he learns the truth, he begins searching for her. In the meantime, Prathiba, who is now reformed, commits suicide. Sekar locates Nirmala, who is on the verge of committing suicide, and they are reunited.

Cast 

 Gemini Ganesan as Sekhar
 Padmini as Nirmala
 K. A. Thangavelu as Sachithanandham Pillai
 T. R. Ramachandran as Gopu
 N. Lalitha as Prathiba
 Manorama as Sachu
 K. N. Kamalam as Kamalam
 K. Nataraj as Nirmala's dance Teacher
 Sairam as Azhagu
 P. S. Venkatachalam as Duraisami

Dance
 Sasi, Revathi, Sakunthala, Rita, Bala, Rajam,Jaya, Shantha, Jayanthi, Nirmala, Nalini, Mohana,Leela, Kamala, Nagu, Vittoba, and Rajeswari.

Production 
Madhuram Pictures initially began a film called Agal Vilakku with S. S. Rajendran and E. V. Saroja starring. Sridhar penned the script for that film; however the film was dropped after the first filming schedule due to Saroja's pregnancy. The company decided to make a new film Meenda Sorgam and chose T. R. Raghunath as director and Gemini Ganesan and Padmini as lead actors. However Raghunath wanted Rajendran as the lead and left the film due to uncertainty in finalising the lead actor which led the film's crew to insist Sridhar to direct this film. The film was produced by T. A. Dorairajan, cinematography was handled by A. Vincent, and editing by N. M. Shankar. C. V. Rajendran, a relative of Sridhar, joined the film as an assistant director, making this the first of many collaborations between him and Sridhar.

Soundtrack 
Music was composed by T. Chalapathi Rao and lyrics were written by Kannadasan, Subbu Arumugam and P. S. Gopalakrishnan. Sridhar signed on Rao as the composer after working with him in Amara Deepam (1956). He initially wanted Pattukkottai Kalyanasundaram to write the lyrics, but could not hire the poet due to his death. The song "Kalaiyae En Vazhkaiyin" is set in Bageshri raga, and "Aadum Arul Jothi" is set to Kalyani.

Release and reception 
Meenda Sorgam was released on 29 July 1960. The Indian Express praised the performances of the cast, particularly Ganesan, Padmini and Thangavelu, along with Vincent's cinematography. Kanthan of Kalki appreciated Ganesan's performance, but felt it lacked newness, though the film could be watched more than once. According to historian Randor Guy, the film did not succeed commercially, as it was thought to be too highbrow and idealistic.

References

Bibliography

External links 
 

1960 films
1960s romantic musical films
1960s Tamil-language films
Films directed by C. V. Sridhar
Films scored by T. Chalapathi Rao
Films with screenplays by C. V. Sridhar
Indian black-and-white films
Indian romantic musical films